Great Altcar is a civil parish in the West Lancashire district of Lancashire, England.  It contains eleven buildings that are recorded in the National Heritage List for England as designated listed buildings.  Of these, one is at Grade II*, the middle grade, and the others are at Grade II, the lowest grade.  The parish is almost completely rural.  Apart from a church, its lychgate, and a war memorial in the churchyard, all the listed buildings are houses, farmhouses and farm buildings.


Key

Buildings

References

Citations

Sources

Lists of listed buildings in Lancashire
Buildings and structures in the Borough of West Lancashire